The Insolvent Debtors (England) Act 1813 (53 Geo. 3 c 102) was an Act of Parliament passed by the United Kingdom Parliament in 1813, during the reign of King George III.

It was enacted in response to the demands on the prison system imposed by the numbers of those being incarcerated for debt, and some concern for their plight. The Act created a new Court for the Relief of Insolvent Debtors that remained in existence until 1861, under the jurisdiction of a newly appointed Commissioner. Those imprisoned for debt could apply to the court to be released, unless they were in trade or guilty of fraudulent or other dishonest behaviour, by reaching an agreement with their creditors that ensured a fair distribution of their present and future assets.

See also
UK insolvency law
UK bankruptcy law
History of bankruptcy law

References

External links
Hansard Debate (15 November 1813)
Hansard Debate (29 November 1813)

United Kingdom public law
United Kingdom Acts of Parliament 1813
Legal history of England
1813 in England
Law enforcement in England and Wales
Debt collection
Insolvency law of the United Kingdom
History of bankruptcy law
Bankruptcy in England and Wales